Songxi County is a county under the administration of the prefecture-level city of Nanping, in the northwest of Fujian province, People's Republic of China, bordering Zhejiang province to the east. Its county seat is located at Songyuan Subdistrict.

Administration

1 Subdistrict 
Songyuan

2 Towns 
Zhengdun

Weitian

6 Townships 
Hedong

Jiuxian

Xidong

Huaqiao

Zudun

Chaping

Transportation

Expressway 
 G25 Changchun-Shenzhen Expressway

Rail 
The area is served by Songxi railway station.

Specialty 
 Xiaojiao

Climate

References

External links
Official website of Songxi County Government

 
County-level divisions of Fujian
Nanping